Nur Nadihirah (born 21 April 1994) is a Malaysian cricketer. She made her Women's Twenty20 International (WT20I) debut for Malaysia on 3 June 2018, in the 2018 Women's Twenty20 Asia Cup.

References

External links
 

1994 births
Living people
Malaysian women cricketers
Malaysia women Twenty20 International cricketers
Cricketers at the 2014 Asian Games
Asian Games competitors for Malaysia
Southeast Asian Games medalists in cricket
Southeast Asian Games bronze medalists for Malaysia
Competitors at the 2017 Southeast Asian Games